Sisira Jayakody  MP is a politician and member of the 15th Parliament of Sri Lanka representing Gampaha. He is the State Minister of Indigenous Medicine, Rural and Ayurveda Hospital Development and Community Health 
Jayakody was former Western Province Provincial councillor in Sri Lanka. He belongs to the United People's Freedom Alliance.

Early childhood and education
Jayakody who was educated at Nalanda College, Colombo and graduated with a law degree from the Law Faculty of University of Colombo passing out as an Attorney at law.

Politics and career
After graduating from University, Jayakody started his career as a tuition class teacher of Advanced Level Logic subject.

He first entered politics in 1996 at the local government election, contesting for the Kelaniya Pradeshiya Sabha from People's United Party, under the leadership of Dinesh Gunawardena and was elected as the only winner from the party.

In 2004 Provincial Council Elections Jayakody gained 23,859 was elected as Member of the Western Provincial Council. Again in 2009 Provincial Council Election he won 49,975 preference votes and elected. He was also the former Chief Whip of the Western Provincial Council.

See also
 2009 Provincial Council Election

Notes

References

 Second phase of Divi Naguma national programme begins
 Bribery Commission gets complaint on Mervyn
 Sisira Jayakody

Sri Lankan Buddhists
Provincial councillors of Sri Lanka
Living people
Sri Lanka Freedom Party politicians
United People's Freedom Alliance politicians
Members of the 15th Parliament of Sri Lanka
Members of the 16th Parliament of Sri Lanka
Members of the Western Provincial Council
Alumni of Nalanda College, Colombo
Sinhalese politicians
1965 births